Crosville Motor Services was a bus operator based in the north-west of England and north and mid-Wales.

History

On 27 October 1906, Crosville Motor Company was formed in Chester by George Crosland Taylor and his French business associate Georges de Ville, with the intention of building motor cars. The company name was a portmanteau on the names of the founders.

In 1909, Crosville commenced its first bus service, between Chester and Ellesmere Port. By 1929 Crosville had consolidated an operating area covering the Wirral and parts of Lancashire, Cheshire and Flintshire.

The Railways (Road Transport) Act, 1928 gave the four railway companies the opportunity to provide bus services. But rather than run in competition they bought into or purchased outright existing bus companies. In February 1929, the London, Midland and Scottish Railway made an offer of £400,000 to purchase Crosville, which was effected in November 1929. The new LMS (Crosville) company then in the next few months purchased Holyhead Motors, and UNU Motor Services of Caernarfon.

Shortly afterwards, the four railway companies reached an agreement with the Tilling Group and British Automobile Traction (T&BAT) to complete a cross-holding deal, whereby each organisation held a 50% share in a series of jointly-held and consolidated regional bus companies. LMS (Crosville) was therefore merged with T&BAT's Royal Blue of Llandudno, and renamed Crosville Motor Services on 15 May 1930, after only nine months of outright LMS ownership.

In the next few months the company consolidated its majority share of the North Wales coastal services, buying up various smaller private companies that operated in the Crosville area, including: White Rose Motor Services of Rhyl, Red Dragon of Denbigh, Burton of Tarporley, North Wales Silver Motors and Llangoed Red Motors. On 1 May 1933, the Great Western Railway's northern Welsh service Western Transport was amalgamated with Crosville.

In 1930 All-British Travels Ltd was formed by coach operators George Taylor of Chester, Alfred Harding of Birkenhead and J.W. Scott of Edinburgh, with sleeping partner Evan R. Davies, a solicitor in Pwllheli. Under the fleet name of 'All-British Line' the initial intention was to run express coach services to and from Liverpool and Llandudno to London via Taylor's Market Square car showroom in Chester and to operate a central London travel agency to advertise those services and the other coach services of the respective companies. This express coach service to London commenced on 14 April 1930. Crosville had also started an express coach service between Liverpool and London in 1929, and by 1933 tried with All-British Travels Ltd to co-ordinate the Liverpool to London service, thereby complying with the North Western Traffic Commissioner's decree to reduce the duplication of that service. A joint timetable was worked on but problems co-ordinating the service proved impossible to surmount. In January 1933 the coach operator, Red & White Services of Chepstow in South Wales, purchased All-British Travels Ltd and in September of that year the remaining All-British Line express coach service between Liverpool and London operated by Taylor ceased. Taylor continued in the coach excursion business and car trade in Chester up to 1972.

Second World War
Although the start of the Second World War brought about cuts in the company timetable, by the end of the war the company had increased passengers by 50% and revenues by 90%. This was through North Wales being seen as a safe area from Luftwaffe bombing, resulting in a number of shadow factories and munitions factories being built in the area. This resulted in the expansion of a number of formerly quiet villages, and hence the route map changed quite dramatically. In example, ROF Wrexham, Marchwiel needed over 200 buses daily.

This passenger demand brought about a change in fleet policy, with the relatively small double deck fleet being considerably expanded, mostly with second-hand vehicles as production capacity at most bus manufacturers had been given over meet the requirements of the military. On 3 December 1942, Crosville became a subsidiary of the Tilling Group, resulting in a change from maroon to Tilling-green livery, and Bristol-chassised buses replacing Leyland as the manufacturer of choice.

Crosville emerged from the war far stronger in many ways, with healthy cash reserves in the bank or accumulating nicely in property assets, unable to replace their fleet at their normal renewal rate. However, although Crosville focused on replacing its single-deck fleet with double deckers, Tilling had a group policy against investment in coaches, resulting in a rise across the geography of a number of new coach operators. By the time that the post-war government of Clement Attlee merged both Tilling and the railway companies into the British Transport Commission on 1 January 1948, and Crosville was nationalised, the coach operators were a sustainable competitive entity.

1948–67

New Bristol double-deckers had become the standard fleet purchase for all Tilling/BET fleets, which allowed the company to serve the post-war boom until 1950, when traffic began to fall again thanks to the increase in the number of private cars. The combination of this, plus the Suez Crisis of 1956 and a lack of staff due to low wages, led to a general contraction of the network of countryside routes and reduced services by at least half on a Sunday. The network continued to decline, except in the provision of a new service to replace railways removed by the Beeching Axe, with the 1965-introduced "Cymru Coastliner," between Chester and Caernarfon anticipating the closure of that British Rail route and the intermediate stations.

1968–85
The Transport Act 1968 created the National Bus Company (NBC), and introduced the principle that rural bus services could be subsidised by councils. Although they had reduced costs by the introduction of one-man operation, Crosville submitted a list of 196 routes that required financial assistance.

With the transfer of routes of the North Western Road Car Company within Greater Manchester to the local Passenger Transport Executive in 1971, NBC split the residual services of NWRCC between Trent and Crosville, with the latter company taking over 119 vehicles and depots in Northwich, Macclesfield and Biddulph in March 1972. A consolidation of companies within NBC resulted in Crosville taking over services in parts of West Wales from Western Welsh, including those from the depots in New Quay, Newcastle Emlyn and Lampeter.

The company continued to consolidate and reduce its network through the 1980s, making losses of £1M in 1980 and £2M in 1981. Rebranding of local services in metropolitan areas assisted in flattening the rate of decline in revenues, but losses continued to mount.

Deregulation
On 13 February 1986, the Secretary of State for Transport decided that, because of their size, the four largest NBC companies would be split, as they provided too great a competitive threat to deregulation.  Crosville was split into two, with the English and Welsh operations divided between two businesses.  Ultimately, both businesses were acquired by the Drawlane Group.

Crosville Cymru was to remain generally in one piece, but most of the remainder of Crosville based in England was split between then-sister companies Midland Red North and the new North Western company based in Liverpool. The latter move was quite a reversal of fortunes, as much of Crosville's territory in the eastern half of Cheshire had been gained from the original North Western company at its dismemberment in 1972.

On 25 March 1988, Crosville was sold to ATL (Western). In 1989 Crosville was sold to National Express passing with the business in 1991 to the Drawlane Group, which in 1992 restructured to become British Bus. On 1 August 1996 British Bus was purchased by the Cowie Group. It traded as Arriva Cymru until February 2002, when it merged with Arriva North West to form Arriva North West & Wales.

The remaining Crosville operations in the Wirral and Chester area were sold in February 1990 to Potteries Motor Traction who retained the Crosville name, but the name passed into history ten years later when rebranded as First Chester & The Wirral. Following losses, the business was sold with depots in Chester, Rock Ferry and Wrexham to Stagecoach Merseyside & South Lancashire in December 2012.

Revival

The Crosville Motor Service name was resurrected by a new operator that operated in Weston-super-Mare from 2011 until 2018. As well as modern vehicles, it had a heritage fleet which includes several vehicles from the original Crosville fleet.

The Crosville Cymru / Crosville Wales Limited name also exists but not with Arriva.  Gwasanaethau Cerbyd Crosville Motor Services Limited also exists. The word ‘Gwasanaethau’ is the Welsh for ‘Services‘ and the word 'Cerbyd’ is Welsh for ‘Vehicle’.  Both company names are registered as dormant companies in Wales.

References

Further reading
Anderson, RC; History of Crosville Motor Services; David & Charles plc 2001; 
Banks, John; The Prestige Series – Crosville; Venture Publications; 2001; 
Carroll, John; 75 Years of Crosville; Transport Publishing Company; 1981; 
Carroll, John & Duncan Roberts; Crosville Motor Services : Part 1 – The First 40 Years; Venture Publications; 1995; 
Crosland-Taylor, WJ; Crosville: The Sowing and The Harvest; Transport Publishing Company; 1987; 
Crosland-Taylor, WJ; Crosville: State Owned Without Tears; Transport Publishing Company; 1987; 
Hillmer, John; Exploring Crosville Country: Part 1: England; Past & Present Publishing; 2005; 
Hillmer, John; Exploring Crosville Country: Part 2: Wales; Past & Present Publishing; 2005; 
Jenkins, Martin & Charles Roberts; The Heyday of Crosville; Ian Allan; 2009; 
Maund, TB; Crosville on Merseyside; Transport Publishing; 1992; 
Maund, TB; Motor Coach Services from Merseyside 1920 – 1940 Part 2 – The Independents; The Omnibus Society; 1980; 
Roberts, Duncan; Crosville Motor Services : Part 2 : 1945 – 1990; NBC Books; 1997; 
Roberts, Duncan; Crosville 3 – The Successors; NBC Books; 2001;

External links
History of Crosvile Motor Services 1911–1990

Companies based in Chester
Former bus operators in Wales
Historic transport in Merseyside
Transport companies established in 1906
1906 establishments in England
Former bus operators in Cheshire
Former bus operators in Lancashire
Former bus operators in Merseyside